Cherdynsky District is an administrative district (raion) of Perm Krai, Russia; one of the thirty-three in the krai. Municipally, it is incorporated as Cherdynsky Municipal District. It is located in the north and northeast of the krai and borders with the Komi Republic in the north, Krasnovishersky District in the east, Solikamsky District in the south, Kosinsky District in the southwest, and with Gaynsky District in the west. Its administrative center is the town of Cherdyn. Population:  The population of Cherdyn accounts for 20.0% of the district's total population.

Geography
About 94% of the district's territory is covered by forests, which are mostly coniferous. Large portions of the territory are also covered by swamps and lakes. Major rivers flowing through the district include the Kama and the Kolva, with tributaries.

History
The district was established in 1924.

Demographics
Russians, at 90.5%, are the predominant ethnicity in the district. Other ethnicities of note include Tatars and Ukrainians, at 1.5% each.

Economy
The economy of the district is based on forestry and timber industry. There is also food industry.

See also
Vilisova

References

Notes

Sources

Districts of Perm Krai
States and territories established in 1924